Botswana competed at the 2016 Summer Olympics in Rio de Janeiro, from 5 to 21 August 2016. This was the nation's tenth consecutive appearance at the Summer Olympics.

Botswana National Olympic Committee sent the nation's largest delegation to the Games. A total of 12 athletes, 9 men and 3 women, were selected to compete only in athletics, judo, and swimming. The nation's team was relatively larger by two-thirds of its size from London 2012, where Botswana registered only four athletes.

Among the Botswana athletes on the team were freestyle swimmer Naomi Ruele, and middle-distance runner Nijel Amos, who built a historic milestone as the nation's first ever Olympic medalist, earning a silver in the men's 800 metres. The most successful athlete from London 2012, Amos was selected to lead the team as Botswana's flag bearer into the opening ceremony.

Botswana, however, left Rio de Janeiro without a single medal, failing to reproduce it from the previous Games. The men's 4 × 400 m relay squad, led by top sprinter Isaac Makwala, came close to adding another medal for Botswana, but finished fifth in the final.

Athletics

Botswana athletes have so far achieved qualifying standards in the following athletics events (up to a maximum of 3 athletes in each event):

Track & road events
Men

Women

Judo
 
Botswana received an invitation from the Tripartite Commission to send a judoka competing in the men's extra-lightweight category (60 kg) to the Olympics, signifying the nation's Olympic debut in the sport.

Swimming

Botswana received a Universality invitation from FINA to send two swimmers (one male and one female) to the Olympics, signifying the nation's return to the sport for the second time in history (the first being done in 2008).

References

External links
 
 

Nations at the 2016 Summer Olympics
2016
Olympics